Alexandra Elizabeth Price (born 5 November 1995) is an Australian cricketer who plays as a right-arm off break bowler. She last played for South Australia.

As a schoolgirl, Price was also a successful Australian rules footballer.  In 2012, at the age of 16 years, she won Port Adelaide's senior best and fairest in the South Australian Women's Football League.  The following year, 2013, she co-captained South Australia at an under-18s national carnival in Shepparton, Victoria, in a performance that won her All Australian selection in the forward line.

Price had her breakout cricket season for the Scorpions in 2014–15.  At that season's Neil Dansie Medal Presentation, she was named as the Most Improved Scorpion, in recognition of her 17 wickets across the 50 over and Twenty20 formats.  She was also rewarded with selection in the Shooting Stars squad.

During the 2015–16 WNCL competition, Price took 12 wickets for the Scorpions, including best figures of 4 for 28 against the ACT Meteors.

Price was a member of the Adelaide Strikers' squad from the inaugural WBBL01 season (2015–16) until 2020–21.  A catch she took during the Strikers' WBBL02 campaign to dismiss Meg Lanning, captain of the Melbourne Stars, has been described as one of the highlights of that campaign. In November 2018, she was named in the Adelaide Strikers' squad for the 2018–19 Women's Big Bash League season.

References

External links

Alex Price at Cricket Australia

1995 births
Adelaide Strikers (WBBL) cricketers
Australian women cricketers
Cricketers from Adelaide
Living people
South Australian Scorpions cricketers